Brad Lynn Komminsk (born April 4, 1961), is an American former professional baseball outfielder. He attended Shawnee High School in Lima, Ohio, where he played basketball and baseball and was an all-state linebacker in football. He received athletic scholarship offers from Ohio State, Nebraska and Clemson. On June 5, 1979, he was drafted by the Atlanta Braves with the fourth pick in the 1979 amateur draft and received a $70,000 signing bonus.

Komminsk was a highly regarded prospect in the Braves system. He appeared on the cover of Baseball America in 1981 and 1983 where he was described as a potential Triple Crown winner and as having the best tools in Minor League Baseball. Hank Aaron described him as a "can't miss" prospect and compared him to future Hall of Famer Andre Dawson. Before ever reaching Major League Baseball (MLB), he was featured on ABC's Nightline and NBC's This Week in Baseball. In 1984, the Braves went so far as to reject a trade offer from the Boston Red Sox which would have brought them future Hall of Famer Jim Rice in part because Boston asked for Komminsk in the deal.

Despite a sterling record in the minor leagues, he never played well in the majors. Komminsk chalked it up to MLB coaches trying to change his mechanics so as "to be part of the Brad Komminsk project." His Hall of Fame manager, Joe Torre, credited his failure to an asthma problem. His Hall of Fame teammate and roommate Tom Glavine wrote that the pressure of high expectations may have hindered Komminsk to some extent. In 2011, Baseball Prospectus included him in a list of the fifty most disappointing prospects of all time. In 2015, Sporting News characterized Atlanta's selection of Komminsk over Andy Van Slyke as one of the five worst draft decisions in franchise history.

Komminsk played parts of eight seasons in MLB. His best season came in 1989 with the Cleveland Indians. He only appeared in 100 or more games one time, a 106-game campaign with the Braves in 1985. Komminsk spent a few seasons in the minors after his final MLB season in 1991, even playing professionally in Italy and for the independent Winnipeg Goldeyes of the Northern League.

He last was the hitting coach of the Norfolk Tides, the Class-AAA affiliate of the Baltimore Orioles. Since the end of his playing days, Komminsk has been a minor league coach and manager with several teams, including the Kinston Indians.

References

External links

1961 births
Living people
American expatriate baseball players in Canada
American expatriate baseball players in Italy
Anderson Braves players
Atlanta Braves players
Baltimore Orioles players
Baseball players from Ohio
Cleveland Indians players
Colorado Springs Sky Sox players
Denver Zephyrs players
Durham Bulls players
Kingsport Braves players
Major League Baseball outfielders
Major League Baseball replacement players
Major League Baseball right fielders
Milwaukee Brewers players
Minor league baseball managers
Nashville Sounds players
Oakland Athletics players
Richmond Braves players
Rochester Red Wings players
San Francisco Giants players
Savannah Braves players
Sportspeople from Lima, Ohio
Tacoma Tigers players
Toledo Mud Hens players
Vancouver Canadians players
Winnipeg Goldeyes players